Beaver Local School District is a public school district serving the communities of Calcutta, Lake Tomahawk, and Rogers in southeastern Columbiana County, Ohio, United States, as well as parts of surrounding Elkrun, Madison, Middleton, and St. Clair townships.

The Beaver Local School District is one of the largest rural area districts in the state, covering nearly 144 square miles.

All sports teams are nicknamed the Beavers, and the district's colors are red and white.

History
On November 19, 1934, the Columbiana County Board of Education passed a resolution establishing the Beaver Rural School District. The district was a consolidation of the following existing rural school districts at that time: Elkrun, Madison, Middleton, Negley, St. Clair, and parts of Center and Fairfield Centralized. Later, the name of Beaver Rural School District was changed to Beaver Local School District.

Administration
Superintendents:
County Superintendent McBride, 1945-1954
George Van Horne, 1955-1964
Roy Cashdollar, 1964-1982
Paul Taylor, 1982-1985
Nelson McCray, 1986-1991
Frank Blankenship, 1991-2000
Willard C. Adkins, 2001-2007
Dr. Sandra DiBacco, 2008-2011
Kent Polen, 2011-2015
Louis Ramunno, 2015-2016 (interim)
Eric Lowe, 2016–present

Current schools

High schools
Beaver Local High School

Middle schools
Beaver Local Middle School

Elementary schools
Beaver Local Elementary School

Former schools
Calcutta Elementary School - 15482 State Route 170, Calcutta; built c.1950, closed & demolished in 2015
Beaver Local High/Middle School #1 - 13052 State Route 7, Lisbon; built in 1956, closed & demolished in 2015
Beaver Local High School #2 - 13187 State Route 7, Lisbon; built c.1963, closed & demolished in 2015
Elkton Elementary School -  42491 Elk Alley, Lisbon; built in 1958, closed in the 1990s
Rogers Elementary School - 8059 Sprucevale Road, Rogers; built in 1951, closed & demolished in 2015
West Point Elementary School - 13360 West Point Road, West Point; built in 1953, closed & demolished in 2015

References

Education in Columbiana County, Ohio
School districts in Ohio
Public schools in Ohio
School districts established in 1934